The District of Columbia Library Association (DCLA) is a professional organization for District of Columbia's librarians and library workers. It is headquartered in Washington, DC. It was founded on June 15, 1894 as the Library Association of Washington City. DCLA's first president was Ainsworth Spofford who was also Librarian of Congress; most of DCLA's initial monthly meetings were held in the Library of Congress. It changed its name to District of Columbia Library Association in March 1901 and became a chapter of the American Library Association on June 28, 1922.

DCLA has had reciprocal member privileges for Virginia Library Association and Maryland Library Association members since 2013.

References

External links
 District of Columbia Library Association website

Library associations in the United States
1894 establishments in Washington, D.C.